Lihuaxuella is a bacterial genus from the family of Thermoactinomycetaceae. Up to now there is only on species of this genus known (Lihuaxuella thermophila).

References

Further reading 
 

Bacillales
Bacteria genera
Monotypic bacteria genera